The Reagans is a 2003 American made-for-television biographical drama film about U.S. President Ronald Reagan and his family. The network CBS had planned to broadcast the film in November 2003 during fall "sweeps", but was ultimately broadcast on November 30 of that year on cable channel Showtime due to controversy over its portrayal of Reagan.

Plot
The miniseries featured James Brolin as Ronald Reagan and Judy Davis as Nancy Reagan, and covers the period in time from 1949 when Reagan was still in Hollywood, through his governorship of California until Reagan's last day in office as President in 1989.

In 1968, Reagan loses the Republican nomination to Richard Nixon. At the end of his 8 years of service as the California governor in 1975, Reagan vies for the Republican party nomination in 1976. Then-President Gerald Ford wins the nomination.

Patti Davis, one of the daughters of Ronald Reagan, is portrayed as a drug addict.

After the assassination attempt on Reagan in 1981, American jets are shot down by Libya later that year.

Controversy
About a month before it was scheduled to air, portions of the script were leaked. As a result of these stories, the miniseries began to be widely criticized by conservatives as an unbalanced and inaccurate depiction of Reagan. CBS reportedly had ordered a love story about Ronald and Nancy Reagan with politics as a backdrop, but instead received what they later claimed was an overtly political film. Supporters of the film claimed that these criticisms were simply partisan bias, and were an attempt to censor a film because it did not always portray the former president in a positive light.

Conservatives began criticizing the miniseries before it was broadcast and claimed that it put words in Reagan's mouth and condemned it as leftist historical revisionism. Much of the criticism was based upon early drafts of the script and featured scenes that were never shot or were cut from the final version. Eventually, after several weeks of outspoken criticism by conservatives, on November 4, 2003, CBS withdrew the miniseries from the broadcast schedule and announced that the program did "not present a balanced portrayal of the Reagans." The network chose instead to broadcast the miniseries on the cable channel Showtime, which along with CBS was owned by Viacom. In a statement on its web site, CBS said:

CBS's denial that it was yielding to the furor did not persuade its critics. The producers of the movie noted that, before the outcry, CBS had approved both the script for the miniseries and had seen dailies as they were shot, and the film had been approved by two sets of lawyers. Jeff Chester, head of the Center for Digital Democracy, a communications lobbying group, said that CBS had chosen not to offend Republicans at a time when the federal government was considering rules restricting ownership of local television stations. CBS executives "made a business decision," he said. "In doing so, they clearly caved in to the political pressure."  Senator Tom Daschle, the Democratic leader of the time, commented that the decision "smells of intimidation to me."

A controversial line excised
One of the most controversial points in the script was the depiction of Reagan telling his wife during a conversation about AIDS patients, "They that live in sin shall die in sin." The screenwriters admitted that there was no evidence that Reagan ever said this; however, in the C. Everett Koop papers at National Institutes of Health, Koop, who served as Surgeon General under Reagan from 1982-1989, stated that AIDS "predominantly affected people--homosexuals and intravenous drug users--who, in the view of President Reagan and his domestic policy advisers, brought the disease upon themselves by engaging in immoral conduct, and who were in greater need of moral reform than of new health information or policies."

This line was dropped in the Showtime and DVD versions of the film. The Reagans producers, Neil Meron and Craig Zadan, have insisted that every fact (but not every line of dialogue) was supported by at least two sources.  However, according to Reagan's daughter Patti Davis, no family member or close friend of the Reagans was consulted by the filmmakers throughout the production.

Another factor which has motivated certain critics to claim bias was that Reagan was played by James Brolin, whose wife Barbra Streisand is an outspoken liberal. Brolin would later play Governor Rob Ritchie, a fictional Republican candidate for the Presidency in The West Wing, while his son Josh would play the 43rd President George W. Bush in the 2008 Oliver Stone film W.

Cast
 James Brolin  – Ronald Reagan
 Judy Davis – Nancy Reagan
 Željko Ivanek – Michael Deaver, Deputy White House Chief of Staff, 1981–1985
 Mary Beth Peil – Edith Davis, Nancy's mother
 Bill Smitrovich – Alexander Haig, Secretary of State, 1981–1982
 Shad Hart – Ron Reagan, son
 Zoie Palmer – Patti Davis, daughter
 Richard Fitzpatrick – Ben Weldon
 Vlasta Vrána – Edwin Meese, Counselor to the President, member of the National Security Council 1981–1985, and United States Attorney General 1985–1988
 Francis Xavier McCarthy – Dr. Loyal Davis
 Frank Moore – Don Regan, Secretary of the Treasury 1981–1985 and White House Chief of Staff 1985–1987
 Aidan Devine – Bill Shelby
 John Stamos – John Sears, Deputy counsel to Richard Nixon and campaign manager for Reagan in 76 bid and briefly in his successful 80 campaign
 Stewart Bick – Lew Wasserman, Hollywood agent and Democratic Party fundraiser who was a lifelong mentor/friend to Ronald Reagan
 Tom Barnett/Tod Fennell – Michael Reagan, adopted son of Ronald Reagan
 Laura Press – Betsy Bloomingdale, well known socialite and close friend of Nancy's
 Dan Lett – Robert H. Tuttle, assistant and director of Presidential Personnel
 Carolyn Dunn – Maureen Reagan, daughter from Jane Wyman
 Victor A. Young – Alfred S. Bloomingdale, close friend and member of President's Foreign Intelligence Advisory Board
 Don Allison – James Baker, White House Chief of Staff 1981–1985, Secretary of the Treasury 1985–1988
 John Bourgeois – John Tower, U.S. Senator from Texas and led the Tower Commission investigating the Iran–Contra affair
 Rodger Barton – Robert McFarlane, National Security Advisor 1983–1985
 Frank Fontaine – William J. Casey, Director of Central Intelligence 1981–1987
 George R. Robertson – Barry Goldwater, Republican U.S. Senator from Arizona and key figure in Reagan's rise in the Republican Party
 John Koensgen – Mervyn LeRoy, Hollywood director/producer who set Ron and Nancy up
 John Robinson – Jerry Parr, Secret Service agent who pushed Reagan in car during assassination attempt
 Sean McCann – George P. Shultz, Secretary of State 1982–1989
 Tom Rack – Elie Wiesel, Jewish writer, Holocaust survivor, professor who was critical of Reagan's visit to Bitburg, Germany to visit a cemetery in which some SS soldiers were buried
 Al Goulem – Oliver North, Decorated U.S. Marine who was on the National Security Council and although controversial, widely believed to be a scapegoat in the Iran–Contra affair
 Suzanna Lenir – Colleen Sterns Reagan, daughter in-law and wife of Michael Reagan
 Claudia Besso – Doria Reagan, daughter in-law and wife of Ron Reagan
 Lubomir Mykytiuk – Mikhail Gorbachev, General Secretary of the Soviet Union
 Tatiana Chouljenko – Raisa Gorbachyova, wife of Mikhail Gorbachev
 Susan Glover – Helene von Damm, assistant of Presidential Personnel and United States Ambassador to Austria
 Daniel Pilon – Donn Moomaw, friend, pastor of Reagan who gave the invocation at the 1981 Inaugural
 Christopher Dyson – Bernie Leadon, one time Patti boyfriend and founding member of the band The Eagles
 Lisa Bronwyn Moore – Kathy Reynolds
 John Andersen – Jimmy Carter, 39th President
 Sarah Carlsen – Sarah Brady, lobbyist on gun control/wife of James Brady who was disabled after being shot during Reagan assassination attempt
 Brett Watson – Paul Grilley, son in-law and husband from 1984–1990 of Patti Davis Reagan
 Peter Colvey – Gerald Ford, 38th President
 Alan Fawcett – Larry Speakes, assistant and White House Press Secretary
 Jerome Tiberghien – William F. Buckley, famous conservative commentator and personal friend of Reagan
 Bibi Burton – Christina Taylor based on Joan Quigley, Nancy Reagan's astrologer
 Marjorie Silcoff – Joan Didion, journalist, essayist, novelist who wrote articles for several papers including Buckley's National Review
 Kevin Woodhouse (uncredited) – John Hinckley Jr., attempted to assassinate Ronald Reagan

References

External links
 
 Full statement from CBS

2003 television films
2003 films
2003 biographical drama films
American biographical drama films
American political drama films
Films about presidents of the United States
Films set in the 1980s
Cultural depictions of Ronald Reagan
Showtime (TV network) films
Films directed by Robert Allan Ackerman
2000s English-language films
2000s American films